Rhyzodiastes proprius is a species of ground beetle in the subfamily Rhysodinae. It was described by Thomas Broun in 1880. It is endemic to the North Island of New Zealand. Rhyzodiastes proprius measure  in length.

References

Rhyzodiastes
Beetles of New Zealand
Endemic fauna of New Zealand
Beetles described in 1880
Taxa named by Thomas Broun
Endemic insects of New Zealand